The All-Ireland Junior Club Football Championship is a Gaelic football competition which began in 2002 and is played by the junior club champions of each county. Prior to that a number of unofficial competitions were held.

The winners of each county's junior football championship compete in four provincial championships. The four provincial winners compete in the All Ireland.

Ardfert, a club from Kerry, made history when they won the All-Ireland Junior Club Football Championship in 2006 and then won the All-Ireland Intermediate Club Football Championship in 2007.

Kerry clubs have enjoyed the most success, with ten clubs winning the All-Ireland Junior Club Football Championship since its official inauguration in 2004.

John Mitchells of Lancashire reached the 2009 final. They were the first team from outside Ireland to reach the final.

Teams

Qualification

List of Finals

Roll of Honour

Wins by Club

Wins by County

Wins by Province

See also
 Munster Junior Club Football Championship
 Leinster Junior Club Football Championship
 Connacht Junior Club Football Championship
 Ulster Junior Club Football Championship
 British Junior Club Football Championship
 All-Ireland Senior Club Football Championship
 All-Ireland Intermediate Club Football Championship

References

External links
Greencastle GAA official website
 2009 Final
 2011 Final report

Junior